Aerva microphylla is a species of plant in the family Amaranthaceae.

It is endemic to the Socotra archipelago off the coast of East Africa, and politically part of Yemen.

Its natural habitat is subtropical or tropical dry forests.

References

microphylla
Endemic flora of Socotra
Flora of Yemen
Least concern plants
Least concern biota of Africa
Taxonomy articles created by Polbot